Sleeping Hollow  is Balflare's third album, released in 2008.

Track listing 
The Day Falls - (05:21)
Bird Cage - (04:12)
Celestial Winter - (04:47)
The Dunes - (04:40)
Rise on the Ashes - (05:47)
When the Hollow Sleeps - (00:46)
Waking in Silence - (04:23)
Tormentor - (03:51)
Sail to The Horizon - (04:44)
The Eye of Pharaoh - (09:04)
Pray for Rosalia - (04:26)

References

Balflare albums
2006 albums